Américo Garcia Fernandes (born October 1899, date of death unknown) was a Brazilian rower. He competed in the men's coxed four event at the 1932 Summer Olympics.

Notes

References

External links
 

1899 births
Year of death missing
Brazilian male rowers
Olympic rowers of Brazil
Rowers at the 1932 Summer Olympics
Rowers from Rio de Janeiro (city)